PIA Planetarium is a planetarium based in Peshawar. It was inaugurated on April 2, 2011 by the then Minister of Information, Khyber Pakhtunkhwa, Mian Iftikhar Hussain. It is established and worked by the Pakistan International Airlines.

References 

Planetaria in Pakistan
Pakistan International Airlines
Buildings and structures in Peshawar